Kishore Bhatt is an Indian voice actor who is known for dubbing foreign content in the Hindi language such as for films and TV programs.

Dubbing career
Kishore was well-known for being the voice actor of James (Kojiro) in the first Hindi dub of the Pokémon.

Dubbing roles

Animated series

Live action television series

Live action films

Animated films

See also
Dubbing (filmmaking)
List of Indian Dubbing Artists

References

21st-century Indian male actors
Indian male voice actors
Living people
Male actors from Mumbai
20th-century Indian male actors
Year of birth missing (living people)
Place of birth missing (living people)